Mukhtar Abdullahi Ali (born 30 October 1997) is a professional footballer, of Somali origin, who plays as a midfielder for Al-Tai on loan from Al-Nassr and the Saudi Arabia national football team. He was born in Jeddah and moved to London as an infant.

Club career

Chelsea
In 2008, Ali joined Chelsea at under-11 level from Leyton Orient and progressed through the club's academy system. He was part of the Chelsea youth side which recorded back to back triumphs in the FA Youth Cup in 2015 and 2016. With 42 appearances in all competitions he was the second-leading appearance maker in the academy and was also nominated for International Somali Sportsman of the Year.

Vitesse
On 29 January 2017, Ali joined Vitesse on loan for the remainder of the 2016–17 campaign. On 19 February 2017, Ali made his Vitesse debut in their 1–0 home defeat against Ajax, replacing Marvelous Nakamba in the 84th minute. On 4 February 2017, he played his first match for Jong Vitesse against SV Spakenburg. Ali went onto appear in five more league games during his loan spell.

On 17 July 2017, Vitesse permanently signed Ali on a three-year deal.

Al-Nassr
On 31 August 2019, Al-Nassr signed  Mukhtar Ali on a one-year deal from Vitesse. On 29 January 2022, he renewed his contract with Al-Nassr until 2025 and was loaned out to Al-Tai. On 29 August 2022, Mukhtar Ali rejoined Al-Tai on a one-year loan.

International career
Ali represented England at both under-16 and under-17 level, however, pledged his allegiance towards the Saudi Arabia national team, and made his senior debut on 7 October 2017 against Jamaica. This was possibly based on the player's assertion that he was instead born in Jeddah, Saudi Arabia.

Career statistics

Honours

Club
Chelsea Reserves
 FA Youth Cup: 2013–14, 2014–15, 2015–16
 UEFA Youth League: 2015–16

Vitesse
 KNVB Cup: 2016–17
Al Nassr FC
 Saudi Super Cup: 2019, 2020

References

External links
 

1997 births
Living people
Sportspeople from Jeddah
Saudi Arabian footballers
Saudi Arabia international footballers
English footballers
English sportspeople of African descent
English people of Somali descent
England youth international footballers
Somalian footballers
Naturalised citizens of Saudi Arabia
Saudi Arabian people of Somali descent
Saudi Arabian emigrants to the United Kingdom
Association football midfielders
Chelsea F.C. players
SBV Vitesse players
Leyton Orient F.C. players
Al Nassr FC players
Al-Tai FC players
Saudi Professional League players
Eredivisie players
Expatriate footballers in England
Expatriate footballers in the Netherlands
Saudi Arabian expatriate sportspeople in England
Saudi Arabian expatriate sportspeople in the Netherlands
Footballers from Greater London
Olympic footballers of Saudi Arabia
Footballers at the 2020 Summer Olympics